The 2012–13 Lega Pro Prima Divisione season was the thirty-fifth football league season of Italian Lega Pro Prima Divisione since its establishment in 1978, and the fifth since the renaming from Serie C to Lega Pro.

It was divided into two phases: the regular season, and the playoff phase.

The league was also composed of 33 teams divided into two divisions of 17 and 16 teams respectively for group A and B.

There was only one repechage from Lega Pro Seconda Divisione by Virtus Entella, because no other teams showed interest to submit the application for the high price of the guarantee and the repayable contribution required.

Teams finishing first in the regular season, plus one team winning the playoff round from each division were promoted to Serie B; teams finishing last in the regular season, plus two relegation playoff losers from each division were relegated to Lega Pro Seconda Divisione. In all, four teams were promoted to Serie B, and six teams were relegated to Lega Pro Seconda Divisione.

Girone A

Teams
Teams from  Apulia, Emilia-Romagna, Liguria, Lombardy, Piedmont, Sicily, Trentino-Alto Adige/Südtirol & Veneto

League table

Promotion Playoffs

Semifinals
First legs scheduled 26 May 2013; return legs scheduled 2 June 2013

Final
First leg scheduled 9 June 2013; return leg scheduled 16 June 2013

Relegation Playoffs
First legs scheduled 25, 26 May 2013; return legs scheduled 2 June 2013

Results

Girone B

Teams
Teams from Apulia, Calabria, Campania, Lazio, Tuscany & Umbria

League table

Promotion Playoffs

Semifinals
First legs scheduled 26 May 2013; return legs scheduled 2 June 2013

Final
First leg scheduled 9 June 2013; return leg scheduled 16 June 2013

Relegation Playoffs
First legs scheduled 26 May 2013; return legs scheduled 2 June 2013

Results

Notes

Lega Pro Prima Divisione seasons
Italy
3